Jean Sorel (born 25 September 1934) is a French actor.

Born Jean Bernard de Chieusses de Combaud de Roquebrune, he worked extensively in European cinema during the 1960s and 1970s with directors such as Luis Buñuel and Luchino Visconti. However, since 1980 he has worked mostly in television. He was married to Italian actress Anna Maria Ferrero from 1962 until her death in 2018.  In 2018 he married Patricia Balme.

Filmography

1959: J'irai cracher sur vos tombes as Elmer
1960: Les Lionceaux as Patrice
1960: I Dolci inganni as Renato
1960: Ça s'est passé à Rome (La Giornata balorda) as David
1961: Vive Henri IV... vive l'amour! as Le prince de Condé
1961: Amélie ou le temps d'aimer as Alain
1961: Gold of Rome (L'Oro di Roma) as Massimo
1962: Vu du pont as Rodolpho
1962: Disorder (Il Disordine) as Andrea
1962: Adorable Julia (Julia, Du bist zauberhaft) as Tom Fennel
1962: Le Quattro giornate di Napoli (The Four Days of Naples) as Livornese (uncredited)
1963:  as Erik Stein
1963: Germinal as Étienne Lantier
1963: Chair de poule as Paul Genest
1963: Un Marito in condominio as Renato Carcaterra
1964: Amori pericolosi as Il legionario (segment "La ronda")
1964: La Ronde as Le comte
1964: De l'amour as Antoine
1965: Le bambole (The Dolls) as Vincenzo (segment "Monsignor Cupido")
1965: Vaghe stelle dell'Orsa (Sandra) as Gianni Wald-Luzzati
1965: Made in Italy (À l'Italienne) as Orlando (segment 3 'La Donna', episode 3)
1965: Weekend, Italian Style (L'Ombrellone) as Sergio
1966: The Man Who Laughs (L'Uomo che ride) as Angelo / Astorre Manfredi
1966: Sex Quartet (Le Fate) as Luigi (segment "Fata Elena")
1967: Belle de jour as Pierre Serizy
1967: Kill Me Quick, I'm Cold (Fai in fretta ad uccidermi... ho freddo!) as Franco
1968: The Sweet Body of Deborah (Il Dolce corpo di Deborah) as Marcel
1968: Adélaïde as Frédéric Cornault
1968: Love Problems as Giorgio
1968: I Protagonisti as Roberto
1969: Una ragazza piuttosto complicata as Alberto
1969: Una sull'altra as Dr. George Dumurrier
1969: L'Amica as Franco Raimondi
1969: Model Shop as Secretary
1970: Uccidete il vitello grasso e arrostitelo as Cesare Merlo
1970: Paranoia as Maurice Sauvage
1970: No desearás al vecino del quinto as Pedro Andreu
1971: A Lizard in a Woman's Skin (Una lucertola con la pelle di donna) as Frank Hammond
1971: Short Night of Glass Dolls (La Corta notte delle bambole di vetro) as Gregory Moore
1971: El Ojo del huracán as Paul
1971: La Controfigura as Giovanni
1971: Je suis vivant! (Malastrana) as Gregory Moore
1972: Mil millones para una rubia as Teniente Barney Holmes
1973: The Day of the Jackal as Bastien-Thiry
1973: Trader Horn as Emil DuMond
1973: Murder in a Blue World (Una gota de sangre para morir amando) as Dr. Victor Sender
1973: The Great Kidnapping (La polizia sta a guardare) as Aloisi
1974: La Profanazione
1975: Une vieille maîtresse (TV) as Ryno de Marigny
1976: La Muerte ronda a Mónica as Federico
1977: Les Enfants du placard as Berlu
1978: L'Affaire Suisse as Paul Suter
1978: The Man in the Rushes as Robert
1979: Les Sœurs Brontë as Leyland
1980: La Naissance du jour (TV) as Vial
1981: Quatre femmes, quatre vies: La belle alliance (TV) as Michel
1981: Les Ailes de la colombe as Lukirsh
1981: Aimée as Pierre Ménard
1981: Une mère russe (TV) as Le fils de 20 à 55 ans
1982: Aspern as Jean Decaux
1982: Le Cercle fermé (TV) as Jérôme Baron / Fabien Moreau
1982: La Démobilisation générale (TV) as Serge Boncourt
1982: Les Aventures de Miss Catastrophe (Bonnie e Clyde all'italiana) as The Captain
1983: Par ordre du Roy (TV) as Le marquis de Ganges (segment "La marquise des Anges")
1985: L'Herbe rouge (TV) as Wolf
1986: Affari di famiglia (TV) as Enrico
1986: Rosa la rose, fille publique as Gilbert
1987: Il Burbero as Giulio Machiavelli
1988: Le Crépuscule des loups (TV) as Werner
1988: Le Clan (feuilleton TV) as Giorgio Stivale
1989: Casablanca Express as Major Valmore
1990: Un piede in paradiso as Holy father
1990: Come una mamma (TV)
1990: Prigioniera di una vendetta (TV series) as Marc (1990)
1991: Millions as Leo Ferretti
1992: Les Cœurs brûlés (TV series)
1993: La Scalata (feuilleton TV) as Alain Morrà
1993: Una Madre come tu (feuilleton TV)
1995: Butterfly (tv) (TV series) 
1995: Il Prezzo della vita (TV)
1995: Fils unique
1995: Laura (TV)
1997: Le désert de feu ("Deserto di fuoco") (feuilleton TV) as Miller
1997: Mamma per caso (TV series) as Giorgio
1997: Dove comincia il sole (TV series) as Antonio Amati
1998: À nous deux la vie (TV) as David
2004: Tout va bien c'est Noël! (TV) as Maxime
2005: I Colori della vita (TV)
2008: L'ultimo Pulcinella
2016: Drôles d'oiseaux as Georges
2016: The Origin of Violence as Charles Wagner (2014) (final film role)

References

External links 

 
 

1934 births
Living people
French male television actors
French male film actors
Male actors from Marseille
French male stage actors
20th-century French male actors
21st-century French male actors